Daviesia glossosema, commonly known as maroon-flowered daviesia, is a species of flowering plant in the family Fabaceae and is endemic to a restricted area of south-western Western Australia. It is an erect shrub with tangled, spreading branches, cylindrical, sharply-pointed phyllodes, and unusually-shaped maroon flowers.

Description

Taxonomy and naming
Daviesia glossosema was first formally described in 1995 by Michael Crisp in Australian Systematic Botany. The specific epithet (glossosema) is derived from words meaning "tongue" and "standard", referring to the unusual shape of that petal.

Distribution and habitat
Maroon-flowered daviesia grows in heath in a small area of the Stirling Range in the south-west of Western Australia.

Conservation status
Daviesia glossosema is listed as "Threatened Flora (Declared Rare Flora — Extant)" by the Department of Biodiversity, Conservation and Attractions and an Interim Recovery Plan has been prepared.

References

glossosema
Eudicots of Western Australia
Plants described in 1995
Taxa named by Michael Crisp